The Caithness flag is the flag of the county of Caithness. It was registered with the Flag Institute as the official flag of the county in 2016. The flag was unveiled by the Lord Lyon, Dr Joseph Morrow, at a ceremony in Caithness House, Wick on 26 January 2016. The Nordic cross design symbolises the ancient ties of the county to the Vikings. The black recalls the county's geology with the famous Caithness flagstone, while the gold and blue allude to the beaches and sea reinforcing the maritime nature of the county and its heritage. The traditional emblem of Caithness, a galley, is placed in the first quarter, with a raven upon its sail as it appears in the county's civic arms.

See also
 Flag of Orkney
 Flag of Shetland
 Flag of Scotland
 List of Scottish flags
 Nordic Cross Flag

References

Caithness
Caithness
Nordic Cross flags
Caithness